Cleoporus is a genus of leaf beetles in the subfamily Eumolpinae. It is known from Asia.

Species

 Cleoporus aedilis (Weise, 1922)
 Cleoporus aeneipennis Chen, 1935
 Cleoporus aenescens (Jacoby, 1908)
 Cleoporus badius Lefèvre, 1889
 Cleoporus costatus Chûjô, 1956
 Cleoporus cuprescens (Baly, 1878) (doubtful assignment)
 Cleoporus dalatensis Medvedev, 1998
 Cleoporus harmandi Lefèvre, 1893
 Cleoporus inornatus Jacoby, 1908
 Cleoporus laevifrons (Jacoby, 1908)
 Cleoporus lateralis (Motschulsky, 1866)
 Cleoporus lefevrei Duvivier, 1892
 Cleoporus lineatus Medvedev & Sprecher-Uebersax, 1999
 Cleoporus maculicollis Jacoby, 1904
 Cleoporus pallidipes (Fairmaire, 1888)
 Cleoporus plagiatus Jacoby, 1892
 Cleoporus quadripustulatus (Baly, 1859)
 Cleoporus recticollis (Pic, 1929)
 Cleoporus robustus (Baly, 1874)
 Cleoporus similis Medvedev & Eroshkina, 1985
 Cleoporus sumbaensis Jacoby, 1899
 Cleoporus suturalis Chen, 1935
 Cleoporus taynguensis Medvedev & Eroshkina, 1985
 Cleoporus tibialis (Lefèvre, 1885)
 Cleoporus timorensis Jacoby, 1894
 Cleoporus trimaculatus Kimoto & Gressitt, 1982
 Cleoporus udovichenkoi Medvedev & Romantsov, 2013
 Cleoporus variabilis (Baly, 1874)
 Cleoporus variegatus Jacoby, 1904
 Cleoporus vietnamensis Medvedev & Eroshkina, 1985

The following are synonyms of other species:
 Cleoporus birmanicus Jacoby, 1892: synonym of Cleoporus lateralis (Motschulsky, 1866)
 Cleoporus cruciatus Lefèvre, 1884: synonym of Cleoporus quadripustulatus (Baly, 1859)
 Cleoporus jacobyi Medvedev & Eroshkina, 1985 (replacement name for Cleoporus lefevrei Jacoby, 1895 nec Duvivier, 1892): synonym of Cleoporus inornatus Jacoby, 1908
 Cleoporus lefevrei Jacoby, 1895 nec Duvivier, 1892: synonym of Cleoporus inornatus Jacoby, 1908

References

Eumolpinae
Chrysomelidae genera
Beetles of Asia
Taxa named by Édouard Lefèvre